Kilinochchi Maha Vidyalayam ( Kiḷinocci Makā Vittiyālayam, formerly known as Kanista Maha Vidyalayam) is a provincial school in Kilinochchi, Sri Lanka.

See also
 List of schools in Northern Province, Sri Lanka

References

External links
 Kilinochchi Maha Vidyalayam

Provincial schools in Sri Lanka
Buildings and structures in Kilinochchi
Schools in Kilinochchi District